The electricity sector of Uruguay has traditionally been based on domestic hydropower along with thermal power plants, and reliant on imports from Argentina and Brazil at times of peak demand. 
Over the last 10 years, investments in renewable energy sources such as wind power and solar power allowed the country to cover in early 2016 94.5% of its electricity needs with renewable energy sources.

Hydropower provides a large percentage of installed production capacity in Uruguay, almost all of it produced by four hydroelectric facilities, three on the Rio Negro and one, the Salto Grande dam shared with Argentina, on the Uruguay River. The production from these hydropower sources is dependent on seasonal rainfall patterns, but under normal hydrological conditions, can supply off-peak domestic demand.

Thermal power from petroleum fired power plants, activated during peak demand, used to provide the remaining installed production capacity. 
Generation from fossil fuel decreased substantially in recent years, with renewables accounting for 94.5% of electricity generation in 2015.
Thermal power from biomass also provides additional power generation capacity.

The shift to renewable energy sources in recent years has been achieved thanks to modernization efforts, based on legal and regulatory reforms in 1997, 2002, and 2006, which have led to large new investments in electrical production capacity including from the private sector. Purchasing agreement offered by the government in the final reform in 2006 incentivized a rapid growth of sustainable energy capacity in the country. Wind power capacity has gone from negligible in 2012 to 10% of installed capacity by 2014.
A new, highly efficient thermal power plant which can run on either gas or oil has been installed.
A number of photovoltaic solar power plants have been built. 
Additionally, a new electrical grid interconnection has improved the ability to import or export electricity with Brazil.

Electricity supply and demand

Installed capacity 
Installed electricity capacity in Uruguay was around 2,500 MW (megawatts) in 2009 and around 2,900 MW in 2013. Of the installed capacity, about 63% is hydro, accounting for 1,538 MW which includes half of the capacity of the Argentina-Uruguay bi-national Salto Grande. The rest of the production capacity is mostly thermal and a small share of wind and biomass.

The power system exhibits characteristics and issues of hydro-based generation. The apparently wide reserve margin conceals the vulnerability to hydrology. In dry years it is necessary to import over 25% of the demand from Argentinian and Brazilian markets.

About 56% of generation capacity is owned and operated by UTE, the national utility. The remaining capacity corresponds to the Salto Grande hydroelectric plant (945 MW), to co-generation or to small private investments in renewable sources. The table below shows the plants that are operated and owned by UTE as of 2008:

Installed capacity had barely changed between 1995 and 2008. The most recent addition was the 300 MW Punta del Tigre Plant, whose last units started operations in 2008. A 530 MW dual fuel (gas/light oil) CCGT power plant, "Punta del Tigre B", is being built in the Punta del Tigre site; construction started in late 2013 and final completion is expected by late 2018. The existing large hydroelectric potential has already been developed and the existing thermal units are low performing. Total generation in the year 2008 was 8,019 GWh, 56.1% of which were from hydroelectric sources, with 42.2% being thermal.

Imports and exports 
In the years leading up to 2009, the Uruguayan electricity system has faced difficulties to supply the increasing demand from its domestic market. In years of low rainfall, there is a high dependency on imports from Brazil and Argentina. Exports have historically been negligible. In particular, no electricity has been exported in 2009.The table below shows the evolution of imported electricity since 1999:

(1) January–June 2009
These energy exchanges happen through two existing interconnections, a 500kv line with Argentina, through Salto Grande, and a 70kv line with Brazil, through Garabi.

Demand 
Total electricity consumption in 2008 was 7,114 GWh, which corresponds to a per capita consumption of 2,729 kWh. Share of consumption by sector was as follows: 
 Residential: 41%
 Industrial: 24%
 Commercial: 20%
 Public lighting and others: 15%

Demand and supply projections 
In the period 2002–2007, after the 2002-2003 economic and financial crisis, electricity demand increased 4.9% per year on average. Electricity demand increased by 7.5% between 2006 and 2007, from 6,613 GWh to 7,112 GWh, reaching a per capita value of 2,143 kWh. Yearly demand increase is expected to be about 3.5% during the next ten years.

Reserve margin 
Maximum demand on the order of 1,500 MW (historic peak demand, 1,668 MW happened in July 2009) is met with a generation system of about 2,200 MW capacity. This apparently wide reserve margin conceals a high vulnerability to hydrology.

Service quality 
Access to electricity in Uruguay is very high, above 98.7%. This coverage is above average for countries with public electricity services. Quality of service is perceived to be good both by companies and residential users.  Companies suffer losses of just about 1.1% of their sales due to electricity service interruptions 

Interruption frequency and duration are considerably below the averages for the LAC region. In 2004, the average number of interruptions per subscriber was 7.23, while duration of interruptions per subscriber was 9.8 hours. The weighted averages for LAC were 13 interruptions and 14 hours respectively.

UTE has implemented a series of measures to reduce electricity losses, which were particularly high during the 2002-2003 crisis. In December 2007, losses were still high, about 18%, of which 7% to 8% were of technical nature.

Responsibilities in the electricity sector 
The National Directorate of Energy and Nuclear Technology (DNTEN) formulates energy-sector policies. The regulatory functions are assigned to URSEA, the regulatory body. Both transmission and distribution activities are fully under the control of UTE, as established by the 1997 law.

Private companies 
Currently, there are four private companies that generate electricity for their own consumption and sell their surplus to the grid: Botnia (biomass, 161 MW), Agroland (wind, 0.3 MW), Nuevo Manantial (wind, 10 MW) and Zenda (natural gas, 3.2 MW). The Azucarlito plant (5 MW) operates in the spot market. The current 6% private contribution to the generation park is expected to increase as investments in new wind power plants materialize.

Renewable energy resources 
Renewables could play a role in future energy supply, in particular wind power, allowing Uruguay to reduce its dependence on imports.

All the potential for large hydroelectric projects in Uruguay has already been developed. Existing plants are Terra (152 MW), Baygorria (108 MW), Constitucion (333 MW) and the bi-national Salto Grande, with a total capacity of 1,890 MW.

Uruguay has a favorable climate for generating electricity through wind power. Installed wind power capacity reached 1,000 MW by 2016, generating 17% of the country's electricity.

The National Environmental Directorate (DINAMA) received several requests for new wind projects by 2009 and UTE had a very positive response to the bidding process launched that year. In August 2009, the government of Uruguay approved a Decree that allows UTE to bid 150 MW of wind power. USD 300 million of private investment was expected as a result. The first wind farm in Uruguay, the 10 MW Nuevo Manantial project in Rocha, started operations in October 2008. A few months later, in January 2009, UTE's 10 MW wind farm in Sierra de los Caracoles also started operations. By 2016 Uruguay had enough wind power to export to Argentina and Brazil at times of high generation.

Biomass based on renewable sources such as rice husk could generate up to 20 MW at competitive prices. Firewood has already been used as a substitute for fuel oil in the 1980s, and cellulose projects expect to generate up to 65 MW for sales to the network.

History

Power sector reform 

In 1997, the national electricity law was updated following the principles of the so-called “standard
model,” which contemplated the separation of regulatory/governance functions from corporate functions, and put in place the regulatory agency URSEA and a market administrator, ADME. The reform contemplated the remuneration of generators in order of merit, the creation of a wholesale market with regulated prices in transmission and distribution, where competition is not possible.

The reform has not been effectively implemented. After passing the modifications to the electricity law, secondary legislation was not forthcoming and the system continued to operate without any significant change. The new model was regulated in 2002 and it was expected that new operators would enter into a competitive market. The market did not develop as planned and demand actually decreased due to the economic crisis in the region. For instance, natural gas provision, which could have supplied new power generating units, did not materialize. Although URSEA and ADME were established, they cannot yet fulfil most of the functions established in their mandate.

Dependence on imports 

For a full decade no power capacity was added to the power system. Prior to the completion of the 100 MW Punta del Tigre diesel power plant in August 2005, UTE had not added a power station to the system since 1995, when the last unit of Salto Grande came online. The absence of commissioning of new production facilities during this extended period was the product of a conscious, strategic decision to take advantage of market developments in Argentina and in the region, which would allow imports to fill any Uruguayan shortfalls, while exporting hydropower surplus production to Argentina and Brazil during wet years.

Dependence on imports from Argentina started to become problematic in 2004. Before 2004, UTE was able to supply its demand through a combination of contracts and purchases on the Argentinean spot market. As a result of the Argentine energy difficulties, UTE's contracts with Argentina for firm supply of 365 MW were reduced to 150 MW and were not extended beyond 2007. Notwithstanding this forced reduction in supply from Argentina over the low hydrology period of 2004–06, UTE was able to maintain energy imports through a noticeable increase of imports from Brazil and purchase of energy from the Argentine spot market. In 2008, supply costs increased substantially as the drought, high fuel costs and low availability of power in neighboring countries.

Policy options 

The Energy Strategy Guidelines for Uruguay were defined in 2006 by the Ministry of Industry, Energy and Mines (MIEM). This strategy includes: (i) diversifying energy sources to reduce costs and emissions, as well as increase energy security; (ii) increasing private participation in new renewable power generation; (iii) increasing regional energy trade; and (iv) facilitating availability and acquisition of energy efficient goods and services, including efforts to raise public awareness regarding demand-side management interventions. According to the National Directorate for Energy and Nuclear Technology (DNETN), grid-connected wind power generation is one of the domestic resources with both medium and long term potential in Uruguay.

The government has taken action to promote RE development. In March 2006, the executive power issued Decree No.77/2006  to foster private generation through wind, biomass and small hydropower plants. A target of 60 MW was established for the first tender, which was conducted by UTE in August 2006. Although bids received for wind and biomass projects were all higher than US$70/MWh, this can be attributed to the small size of the proposed projects and the uncertainty of contractual arrangements.

Interconnecting with Brazil is also particularly attractive. The expansion of the interconnection capacity with Brazil may be carried out either along the Coast or from Salto Grande. This expansion would contribute to diversifying the supply sources and could be done in order to take advantage of the installation of large thermal (coal) plants in the South of Brazil.

Tariffs 

For 2008, the overall weighted average tariff was US$0.139/kWh. Average tariffs for some sectors are presented below:
 Residential:  US$0.177/kWh
 Large consumers: US$0.047/kWh
 Medium consumers: US$0.131/kWh
 Public lighting: US$0.164/kWh

Environmental impact 
OLADE (Organización Latinoamericana de Energía) estimated that CO2 emissions from electricity production in 2006 were 1.55 million tons of CO2. As of September 2009, there were only three registered CDM projects in Uruguay, all of them related to energy: the Montevideo Landfill Gas Capture and Flare Project, the Fray Bentos Biomass Power Generation Project and a project on partial substitution of fossil fuels with biomass in cement manufacture. Total expected emissions reductions are 251,213 tons of CO2e per year.

External assistance 
The only active energy project financed by the World Bank in Uruguay is the Energy Efficiency Project (PERMER), with a US$6.88 million grant from the Global Environmental Facility. The objective this project is to increase the demand for and competitive supply of energy efficiency goods and services, contributing to improved efficiency of energy use, reduced reliance of the Uruguayan economy on imported electricity and fuels, and reduced emissions from the energy sector.

See also 
 Energy in Uruguay
 Economy of Uruguay
 Politics of Uruguay
 List of power stations in Uruguay
 2019 Argentina and Uruguay blackout

Notes

Sources 
 ESMAP 2007. Strengthening Energy Security in Uruguay.

External links 
 UTE
 National Energy and Nuclear Technology Directorate (DNTEN)
 Electricity Market Administrator (ADME)
 National Environmental Directorate (DINAMA)

 
Uruguay